The First Day of Freedom is a 1964 Polish drama film directed by Aleksander Ford. It was entered into the 1965 Cannes Film Festival.

Cast
 Tadeusz Łomnicki - Lt. Jan
 Beata Tyszkiewicz - Inga Rhode
 Tadeusz Fijewski - Dr. Rhode
 Ryszard Barycz - Michal
 Krzysztof Chamiec - Hieronym
 Roman Kłosowski - Karol
 Mieczysław Stoor - Pawel
 Elżbieta Czyżewska - Luzzi Rhode
 Aldona Jaworska
 Mieczysław Kalenik - Otto
 Zdzislaw Lesniak - The Oddball
 Mieczyslaw Milecki
 Kazimierz Rudzki
 Vsevolod Sanayev - (as Wsewolod Sanejew)
 Mikhail Pugovkin

References

External links
 

1964 films
1960s Polish-language films
1964 drama films
Polish black-and-white films
Films directed by Aleksander Ford
Polish drama films